Lyria is a genus of sea snails, marine gastropod molluscs in the family Volutidae.

Description
The shell is small to medium sized, solid, stocky to elongate-fusiform. The radula is uniserial with tricuspid teeth. The protoconchs are smooth. They can be large and globose with a short calcarella or small and regularly coiled. The teleoconch shows axial ribs, exceptionally with true shoulder nodules.

Species
Species within the genus Lyria include:

 Lyria anna (Lesson, 1835)
 Lyria beauii (Fischer & Bernardi, 1857)
 Lyria boholensis Poppe, 1897
 Lyria bondarevi Bail & Poppe, 2004
 Lyria boucheti Bail & Poppe, 2004
 Lyria brianoi Poppe, 1999
 Lyria cassidula (Reeve, 1849)
 Lyria cleaveri Morrison, 2008
 Lyria cloveriana Weaver, 1963
 Lyria cordis Bayer, 1971
 † Lyria craticulata Darragh, 2017 
 † Lyria degrangei Peyrot, 1928 
 Lyria delessertiana (Petit de la Saussaye, 1842)
 Lyria deliciosa (Montrouzier, 1859)
 Lyria doutei Bouchet & Bail, 1992
 Lyria exorata Bouchet & Poppe, 1988
 Lyria grandidieri Bail, 2002
 Lyria grangei Cernohorsky, 1980
 Lyria guionneti Poppe & Conde, 2001
 † Lyria harpula (Lamarck, 1803) 
 Lyria insignata Iredale, 1940
 Lyria kuniene Bouchet, 1979
 Lyria laseroni (Iredale, 1937)
 Lyria leonardi Emerson, 1985
 † Lyria lesbarritziana (Grateloup, 1845) 
 Lyria leslieboschae Emerson & Sage, 1986
 Lyria lyraeformis (Swainson, 1821)
 † Lyria madrakahensis Harzhauser, 2007 
 Lyria mallicki Ladd, 1975
 Lyria michardi Bail, 2009
 Lyria mikoi Kosuge, 1985
 Lyria mitraeformis (Lamarck, 1811)
 Lyria ogasawarana Bail & Chino, 2015 
 † Lyria parens Sacco, 1890 
 Lyria patbaili Bouchet, 1999
 Lyria pattersonia (Perry, 1811)
 Lyria pauljohnsoni Poppe & Terryn, 2002
 † Lyria peyrehoradensis Lozouet, 2019 
 † Lyria picturata (Grateloup, 1834) 
 Lyria planicostata (Sowerby III, 1903)
 Lyria poppei Bail, 2002
 † Lyria pulchella (G. B. Sowerby I, 1850) 
 Lyria russjenseni Emerson, 1985
 Lyria sabaensis Bail, 1993
 Lyria solangeae Bozzetti, 2008
 Lyria surinamensis (Okutani, 1982)
 Lyria tulearensis Cosel & Blöcher, 1977
 Lyria vegai Clench & Turner, 1967
 † Lyria zelandica Finlay, 1924 

Species brought into synonymy
 Subgenus Lyria (Enaeta) H. Adams & A. Adams, 1853: synonym of Enaeta H. Adams & A. Adams, 1853
 Lyria africana (Reeve, 1856): synonym of Festilyria africana (Reeve, 1856)
 Lyria aphrodite Bondarev, 1999: synonym of Callipara aphrodite (Bondarev, 1999)
 Lyria aturensis Peyrot, 1928 †: synonym of Lyria parens Sacco, 1890 †
 Lyria coquillensis F. E. Turner, 1938 †: synonym of Eovoluta coquillensis (F. E. Turner, 1938) † (original combination)
 Lyria dondani Angioy & Biraghi, 1982: synonym of Lyria mallicki Ladd, 1975
 Lyria guttata Reeve, 1849: synonym of Enaeta reevei (Dall, 1907)
 Lyria habei Okutani, 1979: synonym of Lyria mallicki Ladd, 1975
 Lyria harpa Barnes, 1824: synonym of Enaeta barnesii (Gray, 1825)
 Lyria howensis Iredale, 1940: synonym of Lyria deliciosa howensis Iredale, 1940 (original name)
 Lyria kawamurai Habe, 1975: synonym of Lyria planicostata (G. B. Sowerby III, 1903)
 Lyria kimberi Cotton, 1932: synonym of Lyria mitraeformis (Lamarck, 1811)
 Lyria leonardhilli Petuch, 1988: synonym of Enaeta leonardhilli (Petuch, 1988)
 Lyria nucleus (Lamarck, 1811): synonym of Lyria pattersonia (Perry, 1811)
 Lyria opposita Iredale, 1937: synonym of Lyria pattersonia (Perry, 1811)
 Lyria pedersenii Verrill, 1870: synonym of Enaeta cumingii (Broderip, 1832)
 Lyria peroniana Iredale, 1940: synonym of Lyria pattersonia (Perry, 1811)
 Lyria ponsonbyi (E. A. Smith, 1901): synonym of Festilyria ponsonbyi (E. A. Smith, 1801)
 Lyria queketti (E. A. Smith, 1901): synonym of Callipara queketti (E. A. Smith, 1901)
 Lyria reinai Angioy & Biraghi, 1981: synonym of Lyria mallicki Ladd, 1975
 Lyria santoensis Ladd, 1975: synonym of Lyria planicostata (G. B. Sowerby III, 1903)
 Lyria taiwanica Lan, 1975: synonym of Lyria planicostata (G. B. Sowerby III, 1903)
 Lyria valentina Bondarev, 1994: synonym of Lyria doutei Bouchet & Bail, 1991
 Lyria vicdani Kosuge, 1981: synonym of Lyria mallicki Ladd, 1975

References

 Bail P. & Poppe G.T. 2001. A conchological iconography: a taxonomic introduction of the recent Volutidae. ConchBooks, Hackenheim. 30 pp, 5 pl.

External links

Volutidae
Gastropod genera